UTair may refer to:
UTair Aviation, a Russian airline
UTair-Ukraine, a Ukrainian subsidiary of UTair Aviation
UTair Cargo, a Russian cargo airline based in Plekhanov, Tyumen
UTair Express, a Russian regional airline